The Kansas Board of Regents is a body consisting of nine members that governs six state universities in the U.S. state of Kansas.  In addition to these six universities, it also supervises and coordinates nineteen community colleges, five technical colleges, six technical schools and a municipal university. Refer to the list of colleges and universities for details on the individual schools.

Member selection 
The Kansas Board of Regents has nine members, each of whom is appointed by the Governor of Kansas. Each Board Member also serves on various committees that address higher education issues.

Schools governed by the Board of Regents
The Kansas Board of Regents oversees 33 institutions, one of which is an independent municipal university.

Public universities

Municipal universities

Washburn University is on the independent board, of which the Kansas Board of Regents holds one seat.
Washburn Institute of Technology is operated by Washburn University.

Public community and technical colleges

References 

Scott Rothschild & Ben Unglesbee, “New social media policy is broad, vague, and ‘chilling’” Lawrence Journal-World, December 19, 2013.

“Kansas Board of Regents social media rules imperil free speech,” Kansas City Star, December 20, 2013.

External links 
 
 K-State's Archive of KS Regents Communication Records
 Kansas Board of Regents publications at State Library of Kansas' KGI Online Library

 
Governing bodies of universities and colleges in the United States